Tactical pants are trousers with versatile modifications intended for everyday workwear for emergency medical technicians, fire service professionals, plainclothes law enforcement officers (e.g. FBI agents, undercover special police such as SWAT), security guards, and military/paramilitary personnel (particularly private contractors). They are closely related to cargo pants but are typically solid in color.

Tactical pants were originally worn by mountain climbers as more durable outdoor apparel, but are now available in several different styles. Made with 65% polyester and 35% poly cotton ripstop, the belt loops support a large utility belt with the added weight of a sidearm, handcuffs, or other equipment. 

External knife pockets are common, and the double-reinforced buttock and knee areas provide enhanced abrasion protection, with interior knee slots for neoprene & kneepads up to 6 mm (0.24 in) thick. Various styles are reinforced with bar tacks, gussets, and certain brands are coated with Teflon.

References 

United States military uniforms
Trousers and shorts
2010s fashion